Moshe Sofer (II) (1885–1944) (German; Moses Schreiber) was a prominent Orthodox Jewish (Charedi) Rabbi in the early 20th century. He was Dayan of Erlau, Hungary and author of a halachic responsa sefer named Yad Sofer. 
 
He was the son of Rabbi Shimon Sofer (II) (Hisorerus Tshuva), grandson of Rabbi Avraham Shmuel Binyamin Sofer (Ksav Sofer) and great-grandson of Rabbi Moshe Sofer (Chasam Sofer). 
 
He was the father of Rabbi Yochanan Sofer, current rebbe of Erlau.

He was murdered at Auschwitz during the Holocaust.

Early life
Sofer was born on 10 May 1885 to his father Rabbi Shimon (Chief Rabbi of Erlau) and mother Malka Esther Spitzer. Malka was the daughter of Gitel Schreiber (daughter of the Chasam Sofer) and Rabbi Shlomo Zalman Spitzer (1811–1893), Rabbi of Schiffschul, Vienna (author of Tikun Shlomo).
 
In his adolescent years, Sofer learned at the yeshiva of Rabbi Avraham Greenberg in Késmárk, Hungary. He later learned at the Pressburg Yeshiva under the auspices of Rabbi Akiva Sofer (author of Daas Sofer).

Sofer soon became known as a Torah genius and would engage in written halachic responsa with great rabbis such as Rabbi Sholom Mordechai Schwadron of Berezhany, Rabbi Yitzchak Glick of Tolcsva (author of Yad Yitzchak) and Rabbi Nethanel Fried of Balmazújváros (author of Pnei Meivin).

At the Yeshiva, Rabbi Akiva Sofer once pointed out Sofer to a visitor, affectionately saying: "This is our Rosh Yeshiva".

Rabbi Mordechai Leib Winkler (1845–1932) of Mad (author of Levushei Mordechai) wrote that Sofer was baki (fluent) in Talmud Bavli, Talmud Yerushalmi, Rishonim and Acharonim.

Sofer received Semicha from various rabbis prior to his marriage.

Married life
Sofer married Tushene (Heb.: טושענע) (c. 1886-1944), the daughter of Rabbi Moshe Yochanan Schoenfeld (1848–1913), Rabbi of Érmihályfalva.

For a few years, Sofer engaged in business, but was ultimately appointed to preside as Dayan on the Beth Din of the Erlau Orthodox congregation. His father, Rabbi Shimon, requested that he be retested by three rabbis and ordained Semicha once again before joining the Beth Din; something Rabbi Moshe did with ease.

Sofer was offered many prestigious rabbinical positions, but turned them down in order to be with his father and to invest his time in publishing the Torah commentaries of his illustrious family.

Sofer edited and published the works of the Chassam Sofer, Ksav Sofer  and Sofer Mahir (authored by Rabbi Yitzchak Leib Sofer of Drohobych, son of the Ksav Sofer)  and authored many of his own works on the Torah, most of which were lost during the war.

As his father aged, Sofer became more active in communal matters and served as the active rav and dayan of Erlau alongside his father. He also supervised the cheder and yeshiva.

Children
Sofer and his wife had six children; Avraham Shmuel Binyamin, Yochanan, Chava Rivka, Leah, Gitel Tobia and Reizel.

Avraham Shmuel Binyamin was a Torah genius and studied at the Yeshiva of Rabbi Yosef Asher Pollack (1888 – 1944) (author of She'eris Yosef Asher), in Verpelét, Hungary.

He also studied at the Yeshiva of Rabbi Chaim Mordechai Roller (1868–1947) (author of Be'er Chaim Mordechai) in Piatra Neamţ, Romania, from whom he received Semicha.

Yochanan also studied at the Verpelét Yeshiva, and later became Rabbi of Erlau and Rosh Yeshiva of Yeshivas Chassam Sofer in Budapest and Eger. He re-founded the Yeshiva in Jerusalem, Israel and was the previous Rebbe of the Erlau Hasidic Dynasty.

Chava Rivka, Leah, Gitel Tobia and Reizel all were unmarried and were murdered in the Holocaust.

Death and legacy
In 1944, Sofer and his family were deported to Auschwitz by the Nazis (with the exception of his son Avraham Shmuel Binyamin) together with the Jews of Erlau.

On 12 June 1944 (21 Sivan 5704), Sofer, his wife, daughters and his father Rabbi Shimon were murdered by the Nazis.

He was survived by his sons, Avraham Shmuel Binyamin and Yochanan.

After World War II, Avraham Shmuel and Yochanan reunited in Budapest. There they re-established the Yeshivas Chassam Sofer together with Rabbi Moshe Stern (1914–1997) of Debrecen (author of Be'er Moshe).

In 1947, the brothers moved to Eger (Erlau) and re-established the Kehilla and Yeshiva there. Though Avraham Shmuel was older than Yochanan, he preferred that Yochanan assume the rabbinical position, giving him and the Yeshiva full support, both personally and monetarily. Avraham Shmuel engaged in business, but spent much of his time in the Yeshiva studying with the students.

Avraham Shmuel died in 1948, unmarried, due to an illness. He was buried in the Jewish Cemetery in Eger, near the grave of his grandmother Malka Esther Sofer.

Yochanan, the sole survivor of Sofer's family, married Miram Pall (daughter of Yaakov Pall, descendant of the Chassam Sofer's sister). They had three children in Eger; Moshe (1947), Yaakov (1948) and Avraham Shmuel Binyomin Sofer (1949). After emigrating to Israel in 1950, they had four more children; Shimon (1951), Akiva Menachem (1953), Zalman (1954) and Aharon (1959).

Yochanan refounded the Yeshiva in Jerusalem, Israel, and over the years established a network of synagogues in Israel and the USA naming them “Kehillot Yad Sofer” after his father.

Yochanan led a respectable community in Israel retaining the name Erlau. He was a presiding member of the Moetzes Gedolei HaTorah, and a key leader and posek of the Charedi population in Israel.

Written works
Sofer authored many Torah commentaries, most of which were lost during the Holocaust.

Remaining today is his responsa on the Shulchan Aruch named Yad Sofer (Hand of the Scribe). This book of responsa was published by his son, Yochanan, who added his own commentary and notations named Itur Sofrim (Ornament of the Scribes). These sefarim were printed in 1949 in Budapest at Gewirtz Brothers Printery.

References 

1885 births
1944 deaths
People from Eger
Hungarian Orthodox rabbis
Bible commentators
20th-century Hungarian rabbis
Hungarian people who died in Auschwitz concentration camp
Hungarian civilians killed in World War II
Hungarian Jews who died in the Holocaust
Jewish Hungarian writers